P Seethapathy is an Indian politician and Member of the Legislative Assembly of Tamil Nadu. She was elected to the Tamil Nadu Legislative Assembly from Tindivanam constituency as a Dravida Munnetra Kazhagam in the 2016 election.

References 

Year of birth missing (living people)
Living people
Place of birth missing (living people)
Tamil Nadu MLAs 2016–2021